The following is a list of presidents of Pachuca Municipality in Hidalgo state, Mexico. The municipality includes the city of Pachuca.

List of officials

 Humberto Velasco A., 1964-1967 
 Darío Pérez González, 1967-1970 
 Rafael Cravioto Núñez, 1970-1973 
 Gabriel Romero Reyes, 1973-1976 
 Luis Fuentes Núñez, 1976-1979 
 Ladislao Castillo Feregrino, 1979-1982 
 Eduardo Valdespino Furlong, 1982-1985 
 Ernesto Gil Elorduy, 1985-1988 
 Adalberto Chávez Bustos, 1988-1991 
 Mario Viornery Mendoza, 1991-1993 
 Rafael Arriaga Paz, 1993-1997 
 Juan Manuel Sepulveda Fayad, 1997-2000 
 José Antonio Tellería Beltrán, 2000-2003 
 , 2003-2006 
 Omar Fayad, 2006-2009 
 Francisco Olvera Ruiz, 2009-2010 
 , 2010 (interim)
 , 2010-2012
 , 2012-2015 
 , 2016-current

See also
 
 Pachuca history

References

Further reading
 

Pachuca
Politicians from Hidalgo (state)
History of Hidalgo (state)
People from Pachuca